John Donald Fiedler (February 3, 1925 – June 25, 2005) was an American actor. His career lasted more than 55 years in stage, film, television and radio. Fiedler's roles included the meek Juror #2 in 12 Angry Men (1957); the benign-seeming gentleman who tries to prevent the Younger family from moving into a whites-only neighbourhood in A Raisin in the Sun (1961); the voice of Piglet in Disney's Winnie the Pooh productions; Vinnie, one of Oscar's poker cronies in the film The Odd Couple (1968); and Emil Peterson, the hen-pecked milquetoast husband on The Bob Newhart Show.

Early life
Fiedler was born in Platteville, Wisconsin, a son of beer salesman Donald Fiedler and his wife Margaret (née Phelan). He was of German and Irish descent.

His family moved to Shorewood, Wisconsin when he was 5, where he graduated from Shorewood High School in 1943. He enlisted in the United States Navy and served until the end of World War II.

Career

After his discharge from the Navy, Fiedler began acting in Manhattan, New York City, appearing on the radio comedy The Aldrich Family as Homer Brown. He appeared on early television and played Cadet Alfie Higgins on the 1950s show Tom Corbett, Space Cadet, and he made his film debut in 12 Angry Men (1957), as Juror 2. Most of his roles were playing gentle or nervous individuals, though he appeared as the lawyer J. Noble Daggett in True Grit (1969) and in the original Star Trek episode "Wolf in the Fold" (1967) as Mr. Hengist, a Chief Administrator possessed by the spirit of Jack the Ripper.

Fiedler was in the original cast of A Raisin in the Sun as housing committee representative Lindner, a role he also played in both the 1961 film version and the 1988 TV version. He appeared in the film The Odd Couple (1968) as poker player Vinnie; he also appeared on the TV series adaptation The Odd Couple, at the invitation of his friend Jack Klugman, as the manager of a hyper-security building into which Felix and Oscar temporarily moved and as the cruel owner of a "Hollywood" dog. He also appeared in the films Harper Valley PTA (1978) and The Cannonball Run (1981).

He appeared three times in a recurring role on Kolchak: The Night Stalker as morgue attendant Gordy "The Ghoul" Spangler. He also played Mr. Peterson, one of Bob's regular patients, on The Bob Newhart Show, and Mr. Dundee in an episode of the Twilight Zone, "The Night of the Meek" (1960). His many other guest appearances on TV included Columbo, Peter Gunn, Alfred Hitchcock Presents, Perry Mason, Bonanza, Gunsmoke, My Favorite Martian, Bewitched, Get Smart, Star Trek, A Touch of Grace, The Rockford Files, Three’s Company, Quincy, M.E., The Golden Girls, Banacek and Cheers. He also appeared in The Munsters.

Fiedler worked frequently for Walt Disney Productions. His voice was heard in the Disney features Robin Hood (1973), The Rescuers (1977), The Fox and the Hound (1981), and The Emperor's New Groove (2000), and in Disneyland Records' Winnie the Pooh for President. He voiced the character Piglet for the studio's The Many Adventures of Winnie the Pooh (1977), The Tigger Movie (2000), Piglet's Big Movie (2003), Pooh's Heffalump Movie (2005). He appeared in Disney's live-action films Rascal (1969) and The Shaggy D.A. (1976). His last film was a voice appearance in Kronk's New Groove (2005) and in the Square Enix/Disney video game Kingdom Hearts. Fiedler was also the narrator of several McDonaldland commercials during the 1980s, including when Birdie the Early Bird learns to fly and how the Hamburglar got his stripes.

Death
Fiedler died of cancer on June 25, 2005 at the age of 80, in Englewood, New Jersey, at the Lillian Booth Actors Home, a residence for retired entertainers sponsored by the Actors' Fund of America. He was cremated and his ashes were scattered on Long Island, New York.

Filmography

Lust for Gold (1949) as Barber (uncredited)
Cyrano de Bergerac (1950) as Theater Owner (uncredited)
12 Angry Men (1957) as Juror 2
Sweet Smell of Success (1957) as Counterman at Hot Dog Stand (uncredited)
Stage Struck (1958) as Adrian
That Kind of Woman (1959) as Eager Soldier (uncredited)
A Raisin in the Sun  (1961) as Karl Lindner
That Touch of Mink (1962) as Mr. Smith
The World of Henry Orient (1964) as Sidney
Kiss Me, Stupid (1964) as Rev. Carruthers
Guns of Diablo (1965) as Ives
Girl Happy (1965) as Mr. Penchill
A Fine Madness (1966) as Daniel K. Papp
The Ballad of Josie (1967) as Simpson
Fitzwilly (1967) as Mr. Morton Dunne
The Odd Couple (1968) as Vinnie
Winnie the Pooh and the Blustery Day (1968) as Piglet (voice)
Rascal (1969) as Cy Jenkins
True Grit (1969) as Lawyer Daggett
The Great Bank Robbery (1969) as Brother Dismas Ostracorn - Explosives
Suppose They Gave a War and Nobody Came (1970) as Maj. Purvis
Making It (1971) as Ames
The Out of Towners (1971) as conductor on train
Honky (1971)
Skyjacked (1972) as Robert Grandig
Deathmaster (1972) as Pop
Robin Hood (1973) as Father Sexton (voice, uncredited)
Winnie the Pooh and Tigger Too (1974) as Piglet (voice)
The Fortune (1975) as Photographer
The Shaggy D.A. (1976) as Howie Clemmings
The Many Adventures of Winnie-the-Pooh (1977) as Piglet (voice, archive footage)
The Rescuers (1977) as Deacon Owl (voice)
Harper Valley PTA (1978) as Bobby Taylor
Boulevard Nights (1979) as Intern
Midnight Madness (1980) as Wally Thorpe
The Cannonball Run (1981) as Desk Clerk
The Fox and the Hound (1981) as Porcupine (voice)
Winnie the Pooh Discovers the Seasons (1981, short) as Piglet (voice)
Sharky's Machine (1981) as Barrett
Savannah Smiles (1982) as Grocery Clerk
Winnie the Pooh and a Day for Eeyore (1983, short) as Piglet (voice)
I Am the Cheese (1983) as Arnold
Stephen King's Golden Tales as Arthur the Hotel Manager (1985, segment "The Old Soft Shoe")
Seize the Day (1986) as Carl
Winnie the Pooh Friendship: Tigger-ific Tales (1988, short) as Piglet (voice)
Weekend with Kate (1990) as Fish seller
Pooh's Grand Adventure: The Search for Christopher Robin (1997) as Piglet (voice)
Winnie the Pooh: A Valentine for You. (1999) as Piglet (voice)

Winnie the Pooh Friendship: Pooh Wishes (1999, short) as Piglet (voice)
The Tigger Movie (2000) as Piglet (voice)
The Emperor's New Groove (2000) as Rudy, Old Man (voice)
The Book of Pooh: Stories from the Heart (2001) as Piglet (voice)
Mickey's House of Villains (2001) as Piglet (voice)
Winnie-the-Pooh: A Very Merry Pooh Year (2002) as Piglet (voice)
Piglet's Big Movie (2003) as Piglet (voice)
Springtime with Roo (2004) as Piglet (voice)
Pooh's Heffalump Movie (2005) as Piglet (voice)
Pooh's Heffalump Halloween Movie (2005) as Piglet (voice, posthumous release)
Kronk's New Groove (2005) as Rudy (voice) (final film role, posthumous release)

Television

Tom Corbett, Space Cadet (1952, episodes "Ice Caves of Pluto" and "Danger in Deep Space") as Alfie Higgins
All-Star Summer Revue (1952, 1 episode) as Charlie the Stagehand
Studio One in Hollywood as Irvin (1956, episode "A Favor for Sam") and Jouvin (1957, episode "Death and Taxes")
Armstrong Circle Theatre (1957, episode "Night Court") as Kean
The United States Steel Hour (1957, episode "You Can't Win") as Boris
Sunday Showcase (1960, episode "After Hours")
The Twilight Zone as Mr. Dundee (1960, episode "The Night of the Meek") and as Field Rep #3 (1962, episode "Cavender Is Coming")
General Electric Theater (1961, episode "Don't Let It Throw You") as Treasury Agent
The Aquanauts (1961, episode "The Defective Tank Adventure") as Mr. Jacobs
Peter Gunn (1961, episode "The Deep End") as Oliver Neilson
Have Gun - Will Travel (1961, episode "The Gold Bar") as James Turner
Peter Loves Mary (1961, episode "Getting Peter's Putter") as Clerk
Pete and Gladys (1961, episode "The Fur Coat Story") as Charley Brown
Checkmate (1961, episode "A Slight Touch of Venom") as Mr. Mitchie
Brenner (1961, episode "The Thin Line") as Bax
Dennis the Menace (1961, episode "Dennis' Bank Account") as Mr. Clute
The Many Loves of Dobie Gillis as Corporal Grover P. Wister (1961, episode "I Didn't Raise My Boy to Be a Soldier, Sailor, or Marine"), Mr. Wurts (1961, episode "The Ruptured Duck"), Mr. Bean (1961, episode "The Second Most Beautiful Girl in the World") and George G. Cheever (1962, episode "I Do Not Choose to Run")
Adventures in Paradise as Mr. Groper (1961, episode "Man Eater") and Professor Henry Hoag (1962, episode "Blueprint for Paradise")
Alfred Hitchcock Presents as Leon Gorwald (1961, episode "Incident in a Small Jail") and Amos (1962, episode "The Last Remains")
Dr. Kildare as Father Hughes (1961, episode "A Shining Image"), D.V. Dromley (1963, episode "Ship's Doctor"), and Mr. Calhoun (1964, episode "Never Too Old for the Circus")
Thriller (1962, episode "A Wig for Miss Devore") as Herbert Bleake
87th Precinct (1962, episode "A Bullet for Katie") as Cole
Outlaws (1962, "No More Horses") as Ludlow Pratt
The Alfred Hitchcock Hour (1962, episode "I Saw the Whole Thing") as Malcolm Stuart
The Tall Man (1962, episode "A Time to Run") as Abner Moody
Room for One More (1962, episode "The Real George") as Wilson
The New Breed (1962, episode "Hail, Hail, the Gang's All Here") as Perkins
Ichabod and Me (1962, episode "Lord Byron of Phippsboro")
Bonanza (1963, episode "Rich Man, Poor Man") as Claude Miller
Arrest and Trial (1963, episode "Isn't It a Lovely View") as Harry Simon
My Favorite Martian (1963, episode "Man or Amoeba") as science professor Newton Jennings
The Great Adventure (1963, episode "The Great Diamond Mountain") as Philip Arnold
Bob Hope Presents the Chrysler Theatre (1963, episode "One Day in the Life of Ivan Denisovich") as Aleshka
The Bill Dana Show (1964, episode "A Tip for Uncle Sam") as Oliver
The Farmer's Daughter (1964, episode "The Swinger") as Dr. Watson
The Travels of Jaimie McPheeters (1964, episode "The Day of the Reckoning") as Ives
Destry (1964, episode "Deputy for a Day") as Bill Simpson
The Fugitive (1964, episode "The End Game") as Sam Reed
Broadside (1964, episode "The Great Lipstick War") as The Yardbird
The Baileys of Balboa (1964, episode "Mutiny") as Johnson
Perry Mason (1964, episode "The Case of the Tragic Trophy") as Howard Stark
The Munsters as postman Warren "Tiger" Bloom (1964, episode "My Fair Munster," and 1987, episode "My Fair Munster - Unaired Pilot 2")
Gunsmoke as Fitch Tallman (1964, episode "Hammerhead") and Mr. Ballou (1973, episode "A Quiet Day in Dodge")
The Donna Reed Show (1965, episode "Painter, Go Home") as Fred Johnson
That Girl (1966, episode "Christmas and the Hard-Luck Kid") as Mr. Merriman
Please Don't Eat the Daisies (1967, episode "The Thing's the Play") as Arlie Draper
Captain Nice (1967, episode "Who's Afraid of Amanda Woolf?") as Gunnar
Get Smart as KAOS agent Mr. Hercules (1967, episode "Classification: Dead") and as KAOS agent Felix (1969, episode "Age Before Duty")
Star Trek (1967, episode "Wolf in the Fold") as Administrator Hengist
Bewitched as Fergus F. Finglehoff (1967, episode "Nobody But a Frog Knows How to Live"), Mr. Beams (1969, episode "Marriage Witch's Style"), Silas Bliss Jr. (1969, episodes "Darrin the Warlock" and "Daddy Comes to Visit"), Augustus Sunshine (1970, episode "Turn on That Old Charm"), and Spengler (1971, episode "Three Men and a Witch on a Horse")
Death Valley Days (1968, episode "The Great Diamond Mines") as prospector Johnny Slack
The Felony Squad (1968, episode "Man on Fire") as B.G. Travis
I Spy (1968, episode "Suitable for Framing") as Andrew
One Life to Live as Gilbert Lange (1968) and Virgil (1987)
Insight (1970, episode "The 7 Minute Life of James Houseworthy") as Griswald
The Courtship of Eddie's Father (1971, episode "A Little Get Together for Cissy") as The Mild Man
The Most Deadly Game (1971, episode "I, Said the Sparrow") as Alfred
The Chicago Teddy Bears (1971, episode "The Alderman")
The Doris Day Show (1971, episode "A Fine Romance") as Harvey Krantz
Cannon (1971, episode "Flight Plan") as Brent
The Bob Newhart Show (17 episodes, 1972–1978) as Mr. Emil Peterson
Columbo (1972, episode "Blueprint for Murder") as Doctor
Banacek (1972, "Project Phoenix") as Paddle
Bridget Loves Bernie (1972, episode "Bernie's Last Stand") as Morrison
Hec Ramsey (1972, episode "Mystery of the Green Feather") as Pingree
The Odd Couple (1972, episode "Security Arms") as Mr. Duke (Head of Security) and Hugo (1974, episode "The Dog Story")
Banyon (1973, episode "Time Lapse") as Trumbull
A Touch of Grace (1973, episode "The Weekend") as the Desk Clerk
McMillan & Wife as Simpson (1973, episodes "The Devil You Say" and "Freefall to Terror")
Walt Disney's Wonderful World of Color as Bill Wasdahl (1973, two-part episode "The Mystery in Dracula's Castle") and Charles Blackburn (1974, two-part episode "The Whiz Kid and the Mystery at Riverton") and Piglet (voice) in Winnie the Pooh and Friends (1982, segment "Winnie the Pooh and Tigger Too")
Police Story (1974, episode "The Ripper") as Richard Steele
Dirty Sally (1974, episode "The Hanging of Cyrus Pike") as Al Fromley
The Streets of San Francisco (1974, episode "Mask of Death") as Mr. Winkler
Kolchak: The Night Stalker as Gordon Spangler aka "Gordy the Ghoul" (Morgue Assistant) (1974, episodes "The Zombie," and "They Have Been, They Are, They Will Be...," and 1975, episode "The Youth Killer")
The Manhunter (1975, episode "Trial by Terror") as Fletcher
Great Performances (1975, episode "Who's Happy Now?") as Taylor
Mobile One (1975, episode "The Crusader") as Walter James
Phyllis (1975, episode "So Lonely I Could Cry") as Willis Enwright
The Lost Saucer (1975, episode "Land of the Talking Plants") as Chloro Phil
Jigsaw John (1976, episode "The Executioner") as Father Damis
Ark II (1976, episode "The Cryogenic Man") as Norman Funk
Alice as Orville (1976, episode "Vera's Mortician," and 1977, episode "Mel's Happy Burger")
Three's Company (1977, episode "Jack Looks for a Job") as Morris Morris
Switch (1977, episode "Dancer") as Harry Winkler
Tabitha (1977, episode "Arrival of Nancy") as Max
The Rockford Files (1978, episode "The Competitive Edge") as James Bond
Fantasy Island as Mortimer Fox (1978, episode "Trouble, My Lovely/The Common Man") and "Ace" Smith (1978, episode "Carnival/The Vaudevillians")
Quincy, M.E. as Howard Clausen (1978, episode "Matters of Life and Death") and Mr. Weiss (1979, episode "For the Benefit of My Patients")
Vega$ (1979, episode "Demand and Supply") as S.J. Henderson
The Ropers (1979, episode "Your Money or Your Life") as Bill Marsh
B. J. and the Bear (1979, episode "Crackers") as Mr. Crocker
Flying High (1979, episode "Eye Opener") as Potamkin
The Last Resort (1980, episode "Dorm Window") as Slosser
The Misadventures of Sheriff Lobo as Mr. Parkhurst (1980, episode "Police Escort") and "Boomer" Barton (1980, episode "Perkins Bombs Out")
Love, Sidney (1981, episode "The Party") as Dr. Rice
Cheers (1982, episode "The Tortelli Tort") as Fred
Hart to Hart as Arnold (1982, episodes "With This Hart, I Thee Wed" and "Harts at High Noon")
Father Murphy (1982, episode "Outrageous Fortune")
Buffalo Bill (26 episodes, 1983–1984) as Woody Deschler
Amazing Stories (1985, episode "Guilt Trip") as Man on Boat
Tales from the Darkside (1986, episode "The Old Soft Shoe") as Arthur the Hotel Manager
McDonaldland (1987, episode "Birdie Learns to Fly") as Narrator (voice)
The New Adventures of Winnie the Pooh (50 episodes, 1988–1991) as Piglet (voice)
American Playhouse (1989, episode "A Raisin in the Sun") as Karl Lindner
The Golden Girls (1989, episode "Love Me Tender") as Eddie
The Days and Nights of Molly Dodd (1989, episode "Here's Some Ducks All in a Row") as Norman Fuller
They Came from Outer Space (1991, episode "Animal Magnetism") as Mr. Peterson
Winnie the Pooh and Christmas Too (1991, TV short) as Piglet (voice)
L.A. Law (1993, episode "Eli's Gumming") as Francis Pencava
ABC Weekend Specials (1995, episode "Crash the Curiousaurus") as The Stranger
Boo to You Too! Winnie the Pooh (1996, TV short) as Piglet (voice)
George & Leo (1997, episode "The Cameo Episode") as John
A Winnie the Pooh Thanksgiving (1998) as Piglet (voice)
The Magical World of Walt Disney (1998-2005) as Piglet (voice)
Cosby (1999, episode "Refrigerator Logic") as Randy
Winnie the Pooh: A Valentine for You (1999) as Piglet (voice)
The Book of Pooh (31 episodes, 2001–2004) as Piglet (voice)
House of Mouse as Piglet (voice) (2001, episode "Unplugged Club," and 2002, episodes "Goofy's Menu Magic" and "House of Turkey")
Winnie the Pooh: ABC's (2004) as Piglet (voice)
Winnie the Pooh: 123s (2004) as Piglet (voice)

Video games
My Interactive Pooh (1998) as Piglet (voice)
The Book of Pooh: A Story Without A Tail (2002) as Piglet (voice)
Kingdom Hearts (2002) as Piglet (voice)
Piglet's Big Game (2003) as Piglet (voice)
Winnie the Pooh's Rumbly Tumbly Adventure (2005) as Piglet (voice)

References

External links

1925 births
2005 deaths
American male film actors
American male radio actors
American male stage actors
American male television actors
American male voice actors
American people of German descent
American people of Irish descent
Deaths from cancer in New Jersey
Male actors from Wisconsin
Marshall University alumni
Military personnel from Wisconsin
People from Englewood, New Jersey
People from Platteville, Wisconsin
People from Shorewood, Wisconsin
Shorewood High School (Wisconsin) alumni
United States Navy personnel of World War II
United States Navy sailors
20th-century American male actors
21st-century American male actors